Left Side of the Brain is the second album by the rock band Fiction Plane. The band supported the album in 2007 when it was the opening act for The Police Reunion Tour. Two singles were released from the album: "Two Sisters" and "It's a Lie".

Track listing
All songs written by Fiction Plane except 4, 8, 9, and 11 by Fiction Plane and Dan Brown.

Charts

References

2007 albums
Fiction Plane albums
Bieler Bros. Records albums